Killarney Legion are a Gaelic Athletic Association club from Killarney in County Kerry, Ireland. The club was founded on a March evening in 1929 when a group of eleven men held a meeting in the then Temperance Hall in High Street, Killarney.

History
In the Kerry Senior Football Championship, Legion reached the 3rd round by beating John Mitchels of Tralee 0-16 to 1-6, then losing to rivals Dr. Crokes 1-16 to 0-9. Legion now have a new state of the art clubhouse and have just commenced the development of a stand aligning the southern side of the main pitch. The stature of the juvenile section of the club is at an all-time high at present. Legion's U14 team represented Kerry in the Feile competition of 2006 held in Wicklow and again in 2009 held in Kildare. Also the minor teams (U18) have reached three county finals in a row since 2007, winning two. The club won the Under 21 Club Chamoionship in 2011 and 2012. Legion's senior team was relegated to Division 2 for the 2014 season, but won that straight away. Killarney Legion GAA came so close to winning the County Championship 2015 after beating Mid Kerry, Feale Rangers, Kerins O' Rahillys and Rathmore. Legion met South Kerry in the County Final but lost in extra time of a replay.

As of October 2020, the club acquired a new floodlighting system, and upgraded the gym.

Notable players
Notable players include:
 Brian Kelly - Kerry GAA Goalkeeper
 Jonathan Lyne - Kerry GAA Wing-Back
 James O'Donoghue - Kerry GAA Senior Centre Forward

All-Ireland medal winners from the Legion include:

All-Ireland Senior Football Championship

Ml. Coffey 1926
D. O'Connor 1929-32
Timmy O'Leary 1937-39
Ml. Lyne 1937-41
Jackie Lyne 1946-53
Denny Lyne 1946
Donie Murphy 1953
Mixie Palmer 1953-55
Gerald O'Sullivan 1953-55
J. J. Sheehan 1953-55
 Johnny Culloty 1955-59-62-69(c)-70
 Diarmuid O'Donoghue 1980-84
 Peter O'Leary 1997, 2000
 John Cronin 2004
 Brian Kelly 2014
 Jonathan Lyne 2014
 James O'Donoghue 2014

All-Ireland Junior Football Championship

Ml. Coffey 1924
Ml. Lyne 1941
Denny Lyne 1941
Teddy Lyne 1941
John Murphy 1941
J. C. Cooper 1949
Mixie Palmer 1949
om Spillane 1954
Johnny Culloty 1954
Weeshie Fogarty 1967
Diarmuid O'Donoghue 1983
Padraig Brosnan 1983
Sean Hegarty 2006 (Captain)
Pádraig O’Connor 2019

All-Ireland Under-21 Football Championship

Denny Murphy 1975
Padraig Brosnan 1976
Peter O'Leary 1990
Sean Hegarty 1998

All-Ireland Minor Football Championship

Timmy O'Leary 1931-32-33
Ml. Lyne 1933
Johnny Brien 1946
Donie Murphy 1946
J. J. Sheehan 1946
Marcus O'Neill 1950
Tim Kelliher 1963
Padraig Brosnan 1975
Paudie Sheehan 1975
Richard O'Brien 1980
Peter O'Leary 1988
Cian Gammell 2017
Darragh Lyne 2018
Kieran O'Donoghue 2018

All-Ireland Senior Club Football Championship
(with East Kerry)Ml. Lyne (Faugh) 1971
Noel Power 1971
Weeshie Fogarty 1971
Johnny Culloty 1971

National Football League

D. O'Connor 1928-29-30
Johnny Culloty 1958-60-61-63-69-71
Peter O'Leary 1997
Diarmuid O'Donoghue 1984
John Cronin 2004

Railway Cup Football

D. O'Connor 1931
Jackie Lyne 1946-48-49
Tom Spillane 1949

All-Ireland Junior Hurling Championship

Johnny Culloty 1961

All-Ireland Colleges Hogan Cup

Donie Murphy
J. J. Sheahan
Pat Lucey with Munster 1947
Tommy Leahy with St. Brendan's 1969
Denis Doodey, Donal O'Leary, Darren Counihan, Ted Bowler

Universities Sigerson Cup

Jackie Lyne U.C.C. 1943
John Trant U.C.G. 1948-50
Donie Murphy U.C.G. 1948
John Keane U.C.C. 1988 (Captain)
Sean Hegarty Tralee IT 1999
Brian Kelly University College Cork 2014
Shaun Keane University College Cork 2014

Roll of honour

 Kerry Senior Football Championship: (1) 1946 Runners-Up 2015
 County Club Championship: (1) 1994 Runners-Up 2013, 2014
 Kerry Intermediate Football Championship: (1) 2005
 Kerry County Football League - Division 1: (1) 1993
 East Kerry Senior Football Championship O'Donoghue Cup: (5) 1954, 1955, 1967, 1976, 2019 Runners-Up 1958, 1959, 1960, 1961, 1962, 1984, 2013, 2014, 2015
 East Kerry Senior League Title: (7) 1933, 1936, 1943, 1944, 1947, 1950, 1953
 East Kerry Junior Football Championship: (2) 1980, 2014
 East Kerry Junior League Titles:'''(6) 1932, 1934, 1946, 1954, 1974, 1976.

References

External links
Official Legion Club GAA Website

Gaelic games clubs in County Kerry
Gaelic football clubs in County Kerry
Sport in Killarney